is a Japanese film director and a professor at the Japan Institute of the Moving Image. He started his career with pornographic films, and since then he has dealt with a wide range of subjects regardless of genre. He won the award for Best Director at the 12th Yokohama Film Festival for Sakura no Sono.

Filmography
 Sakura no Sono (1990)
 Coquille (1999)
 Konsento (2001)
 Tomie: The Final Chapter -Forbidden Fruit- (2002)
 Sakura no Sono (2008)

References

External links

1951 births
Living people
Japanese film directors
People from Kagoshima